The 1898–99 season was the seventh in the history of the Western Football League.

For this season the league was restructured again after many clubs left the league. The Professional Section of last season was renamed Division One, and the two-division Amateur Section became one single division, Division Two.

Swindon Town were the champions of Division One, and also competed in the Southern League during this season, along with Southampton and Bedminster. Trowbridge Town and multiple champions Warmley also competed in both leagues, but both clubs disbanded during the season. The Division Two champions for the first time were Staple Hill.

Division One
Two new clubs joined Division One, which was reduced to seven clubs from eight after Bristol City, Reading and Eastleigh left.
Bedminster, promoted from the Amateur Section
Southampton
Eastville Rovers changed their name to Bristol Eastville Rovers, this being their only season under that name.

Division Two (Amateur)
This eight-club division was a merger of the old Amateur Section Divisions One and Two, containing the surviving clubs from both divisions, plus two new clubs:
Bristol Amateurs
Mount Hill

References

1898-99
1898–99 in English association football leagues